Ai no Uta, "Love Song" in Japanese, may refer to:

Albums
 Ai no Uta (album), by Ai Nonaka, 2006

Songs
 "Ai no Uta" (Kumi Koda song), 2007
 "Ai no Uta" (Strawberry Flower song), 2001
 "Ai no Uta (Words of Love)", by Haruka Chisuga, 2016
 "Swallowtail Butterfly (Ai no Uta)", by Yen Town Band, 1996
 "Ai no Uta", by Angela Aki from Today, 2007
 "Ai no Uta", by Buck-Tick from Mona Lisa Overdrive, 2003
 "Ai no Uta", by Do As Infinity from True Song, 2002
 "Ai no Uta", by Eiko Shimamiya from Ozone, 2003
 "Ai no Uta", by Every Little Thing from Many Pieces, 2003
 "Ai no Uta", by Hitomi Shimatani from Flare, 2007
 "Ai no Uta", by Miki Imai, 2005
 "Ai no Uta", by Misia from Marvelous, 2001
 "Ai no Uta", by Nanase Aikawa, 2004
 "Ai no Uta", by Psycho le Cemu from Frontiers, 2003
 "Ai no Uta", by Something Else, 1999
 "Ai no Uta", by Tanpopo from the single "Motto"
 "Ai no Uta", by Yui Sakakibara, 2007